This is a partial list of motorcycle models produced by the Associated Motor Cycles (AMC) from its foundation in 1938 to incorporations as Norton-Villiers-Triumph.  Many models were produced to the same specification under the badge names of AJS and Matchless.

AJS and Matchless model list

See also
List of Ariel motorcycles
List of BSA motorcycles
List of Triumph motorcycles
List of Norton motorcycles
List of Royal Enfield motorcycles
List of Velocette motorcycles
List of Vincent motorcycles

 
AMC
AMC